Ctenucha andrei is a moth of the family Erebidae.

References

andrei
Moths described in 1912